Jack Timothy Riggs (born 1954) is an American physician, businessman, and politician from Idaho who served as the 38th lieutenant governor of Idaho from 2001 to 2003.

Career 

Riggs worked as a physician in Coeur d'Alene. He has owned and operated his own real estate company, JaxGroup & JaxLand Real Estate, since 2007.

Riggs also worked as CEO of Pita Pit USA, Inc. from 2005, when it acquired the Pita Pit system (franchise) in the U.S., until 2018.

Idaho Senate 
Riggs was unopposed in the Republican primary. Riggs defeated Democratic incumbent Mary Lou Reed and Ust candidate Charles Eberle with 51% of the vote in the general election. He was re-elected in 1998 and 2000.

Lieutenant governor of Idaho 
He was appointed lieutenant governor by Governor Dirk Kempthorne in January 2001 to fill a vacancy left by the resignation of longtime Lieutenant Governor Butch Otter, who won a seat in the United States House of Representatives in the 2000 election.

Riggs ran for a full term in 2002 but was defeated by State Senator Jim Risch in the Republican primary, ending his tenure as lieutenant governor.

Personal life 
His son, Peter Riggs, serves in the Idaho Legislature.

References

1954 births
Living people
People from Coeur d'Alene, Idaho
University of Idaho alumni
University of Washington School of Medicine alumni
Physicians from Idaho
Republican Party Idaho state senators
Lieutenant Governors of Idaho
21st-century American politicians
American chief executives of food industry companies
American retail chief executives